The 2005 Women's South American Volleyball Championship was the 26th edition of the Women's South American Volleyball Championship, organised by South America's governing volleyball body, the Confederación Sudamericana de Voleibol (CSV). It was held in La Paz, Bolivia from September 17 to 23, 2005.

Teams

Competition System
The competition system for the 2005 Women's South American Championship was a single Round-Robin system. Each team plays once against each of the 6 remaining teams with one team having a break each date. Points are accumulated during the whole tournament, and the final ranking is determined by the total points gained.

The matches were divided into 2 rounds.

Round 1: Top 3 teams (Brazil, Peru and Argentina according to FIVB Ranking) will play against the 4 remaining teams.

Round 2: Top 3 teams will play against each other, the 4 remaining teams will play against each other too.

Matches

Standings

|}

Round 1

|}

Round 2

|}

Final standing

Individual awards

Most Valuable Player

Best Spiker

Best Blocker

Best Server

Best Digger

Best Setter

Best Receiver

Best Libero

References

Women's South American Volleyball Championships
International volleyball competitions hosted by Bolivia
South American Volleyball Championships
Volleyball
2005 in South American sport
September 2005 sports events in South America
21st century in La Paz